James Michael "Jamie" Whitham (born 6 September 1966), is an English former professional motorcycle road racer. He raced in most major British and international championships, winning the British championship twice. The readers of Motorcycle News voted him 'Man of the Year' in both 1991 and 1996.

After retiring from racing he works as a television motorcycle race commentator, runs road-race tuition track days, and operates a small private airstrip near Huddersfield.

Early years
Born in Huddersfield, Yorkshire, England, Whitam's first motorcycle as a child was a Raleigh Wisp, a small-wheeled moped, and his favourite early road-going machine was a Yamaha FS1-E, but he admitted to Motorcycle News in 1994 that he was more embarrassed at taking his learner-test with a Suzuki X-5 200 cc sidecar outfit.

He won the 1986 British 80 cc Championship, the 1988 1300 cc Production British Championship, the 1988 Mallory Park Race of the Year, the 1991 MCN TT Superbike Challenge, with Suzuki; and for Yamaha in 1993 both the British Superbike Championship Supercup and the ACU TT Superbike British Championship. He confirmed to Motor Cycle News in 1994 prior to his World Superbike career that his best biking moment was winning the 750 cc double British championship for Yamaha, and that doing 185 mph at Daytona Speedbowl banking was exhilarating.

He competed in the 1992 French Grand Prix at Magny Cours. He also competed on the Isle of Man - running in the Manx Grand Prix in 1985, and the TT from 1986 to 1989, with three top six results; and he won British championship races at Superstock, Seniorstock, Supersport 600 and TT Formula One levels.

International racing and health problems
In 1994 he raced full-time in the Superbike World Championship for Ducati with team-mate Carl Fogarty, taking a race win at Sentul and finishing 7th overall. He returned to the British series in 1995, leading the standings and taking a podium as a World Superbike Championship wild-card at Brands Hatch, but was diagnosed with Hodgkin lymphoma mid-season. He recovered in time to be British Superbike Championship runner-up in 1996 on a Yamaha, despite not scoring at the first round  - he won ten races, twice the number of champion Niall Mackenzie.

He raced for the Harris Suzuki team in the World Superbike Championship in 1997 and 1998, finishing 8th in the championship both seasons with a total of 3 podiums, but for 1999 the factory contract changed hands, and the new owners hired Pierfrancesco Chili and Katsuaki Fujiwara. Worse was to follow when he was hired by Kenny Roberts' uncompetitive Modenas 500cc World Championship team: he crashed heavily at Brno, breaking his pelvis.

Following his win at Donington during 1999 in a one-off appearance, he competed in the Supersport World Championship from 2000 to 2002. He won his very first race in 2000 before a string of crashes (including while leading at Misano) knocked his confidence and relegated him to 8th overall in 2000. He was 4th overall in 2001, forced to support team-mate Paolo Casoli's bid for the championship. In 2002 he won in the wet at Silverstone, before glaucoma, an eye-condition most likely a consequence of past chemotherapy, caused him to retire at the end of the year. In total he took 4 World Supersport victories  and 12 podiums. He held the Supersport lap record at Donington Park until Kenan Sofuoglu beat it in 2007.

Whitham confirmed at his own website in May 2017 that his previous cancer problems had recurred, requiring urgent and ongoing chemotherapy and other treatments. This was further updated in December. Whitham was unable to present television coverage of the Isle of Man TT races in May/June 2018 due to intensive treatments as an in-patient at Jimmy's hospital, in the city of Leeds, West Yorkshire.

British Superbike Championship
(key) (Races in bold indicate pole position) (Races in italics indicate fastest lap)

Superbike World Championship results

(key) (Races in bold indicate pole position) (Races in italics indicate fastest lap)

Post racing
Whitham now operates Crosland Moor airfield, and also runs race-tuition track days, previously with business partner Paul Shoesmith under the defunct company Speed Freak.

He established a second career as a popular TV analyst for Eurosport, Channel 4 and ITV. Whitham provides commentary and analysis for the Isle of Man TT coverage by ITV4 alongside former racer Steve Parrish, which is shown on Velocity Channel in the United States.

Whitham also works as a road tester for the British motorcycle magazine Visordown, and has also worked with the young riders of the Virgin Media Cup. In 2008 he launched his autobiography, 'What A Good Do!'. From January 2013 he hosted and presented The Superbike Show on Loaded TV.

Whitham was awarded an honorary Doctorate qualification by Huddersfield University in July 2009.

References

1966 births
Living people
Sportspeople from Huddersfield
British motorcycle racers
English motorcycle racers
500cc World Championship riders
Superbike World Championship riders
British Superbike Championship riders
Supersport World Championship riders
Motorsport announcers